Korova may refer to:
 Korovakill, an Austrian band formerly named Korova
 Korova (record label), a record label
 Korova (Liverpool), a bar in Liverpool, England
 Korova Russian word for cow.
 The Russian-language title of The Cow (1989 film), an animated short film by Aleksandr Petrov